Somare is a surname. Notable people with the surname include: 

Arthur Somare, Papua New Guinean politician
Michael Somare (1936–2021), Papua New Guinean politician and first prime minister